The Aga Khan Junior Academy, Nairobi, is situated in the suburb of Parklands neighborhood of Nairobi, Kenya.

History and operations
Established in 1970, the school accommodates about 300 students from international and multi-cultural backgrounds. It is open to all races, religions and nationalities and is part of the Aga Khan Education Service, Kenya (AKES, K).

The Aga Khan Junior Academy offers the Primary Years Programme (PYP) of the International Baccalaureate (IB).

The school faculty is multi-cultural and international. All teaching staff hold at least a graduate degree.

See also

 Aga Khan Academy, Nairobi
 Aga Khan Development Network
 Education in Kenya
 List of schools in Kenya

External links
 

1970 establishments in Kenya
Nairobi Junior
Educational institutions established in 1970
Elementary and primary schools in Kenya
International Baccalaureate schools in Kenya
Schools in Nairobi